Crazy Chase is cartridge number 44 in the official Philips line of games for the Philips Videopac. The North American version for the Magnavox Odyssey² was called K.C.'s Krazy Chase!, an inside reference to then president of Philips Consumer Electronics Kenneth C. Menkin. It is a sequel to K.C. Munchkin!.

Reception
K.C.'s Krazy Chase! was well received, gaining a Certificate of Merit in the category of "1984 Most Humorous Video Game/Computer Game" at the 5th annual Arkie Awards.

See also
K.C. Munchkin!

References

1982 video games
Magnavox Odyssey 2 games
Maze games
Video games developed in the United States